The Cabal is a secret society of supervillains and antiheroes appearing in American comic books published by Marvel Comics. As a more villainous counterpart to the Illuminati, the group was formed in the "Dark Reign" storyline very shortly after the Secret Invasion event.

Publication history
The Cabal first appeared in Secret Invasion #8 and was created by Brian Michael Bendis and Leinil Francis Yu.

Fictional team history
During a presentation shown by Bendis during the 2008 convention season, a picture was made public of a second Illuminati group consisting of villains and former villains. Presented in the same pose as the cover of Illuminati #1, this group was revealed to include Namor, Doctor Doom, Emma Frost, Loki, The Hood, and Norman Osborn. The Sub-Mariner is thus revealed to be affiliated with two different Illuminati groups simultaneously allied with both heroes and villains.

Uncanny X-Men writer Matt Fraction mentioned in an interview that the Uncanny X-Men annual in January will explain how Emma Frost was invited into the team. Loki was revealed to have dealings with Doctor Doom in recent issues of Thor and Namor was shown to have formed an alliance with Doctor Doom at the end of his last limited series. Namor had previously been aligned with Doom in the 1970s series Super-Villain Team-Up. A past connection between Emma Frost and Namor was presented in Uncanny X-Men Annual #2, where it was revealed that Emma and Namor shared a brief romance while attempting to recruit Namor into the Hellfire Club as the new White King.

The group, referred as the Cabal in certain interviews and in Marvel Spotlight: Dark Reign, first appeared at the ending of Secret Invasion #8 when Norman Osborn greets the villains after he was awarded control over the entire Fifty State Initiative program and will work behind in the scenes through the "Dark Reign" storyline.

The Cabal parallels the original Illuminati and Bendis has said "[t]he idea was, in the original pitch, that there was a secret group, a cabal, that got put together that was the mirror image of the Illuminati, with five or six characters who almost mirrored the other group."

 Norman Osborn, like Tony Stark (now a fugitive from the law and having lost his company, his morale and his friends), is a human entrepreneur who works with the government. Norman also has a mysterious, powerful ally backing him up in case of betrayal, later revealed to be The Void.
 Doctor Doom represents the scientific side of the Marvel Universe, like his longtime rival Mister Fantastic.
 Emma Frost serves as the telepathic mutant representative, like Professor X before her. Unlike the rest of the Cabal, Emma Frost's motives for joining the Cabal can be seen as righteous, due to her desire to forge an alliance with Osborn that will protect mutantkind from governmental tyranny.
 Loki is the Norse god of mischief. His/her mastery of sorcery mirrors Dr. Strange's (with whom he has occasionally clashed in the past). Loki is a prominent member of a superhuman community outside of society, the Asgardians (the Norse Gods).
 The Hood mirrors Black Bolt, a hero-king in charge of a group of powerful outsiders. He also represents the criminal element of society. His link to Dormammu also places him in the mirror side of Dr. Strange. The Hood is now shown to be superior to Strange, as said by Strange himself when the two struggled.
 Namor has served in both groups; he is also the subject of dual alliances within the Cabal to potentially bring down Osborn, having made side deals with Emma Frost and Doctor Doom to aid them if they ever should move against Osborn.

Dark Reign
The Cabal are acknowledged by other villains as an extremely powerful group - even Dracula himself sought an agreement from Doom that the Cabal (Doom's "new allies") would allow him to conquer the United Kingdom without interference before he began his assault. Loki (a personal ally of Doctor Doom around this time), as the Scarlet Witch, though agreeing to deliver a message from Hank Pym in outer space to the British intelligence agency, asking them to stop all international air traffic, was not willing to breach the mystical barrier Dracula had erected sealing in Britain for some reason; though Dracula himself was uncertain why this was so, he claimed that he predicted that this would be so. However, ultimately Doom chooses to betray Dracula and free his captive, Meggan.

The Cabal are gathered for the second time since their first meeting (after the banishment of Thor), projected upon a psychic plane by the willing Emma Frost, who reminds them to set up psychic shields. Doctor Doom scoffs arrogantly that he has no need of such things, and Loki cautions him otherwise, as they are all of dubious trustworthiness. Doom asks Loki to peer into his naked soul, claiming it holds "a force to be reckoned with." An impatient Osborn orders the Cabal to continue, and the six most powerful beings on Earth continue their discussion of various topics. Osborn promises to take care of the Mighty Avengers, and other issues are discussed, such as the unsuccessful hunt for Tony Stark, the pouring in of the Asgardians into Latveria (which Loki argues was in accordance to her agreement with Doom), the reinstating of Doctor Doom as monarch, the massing mutants from San Francisco, the problem of Mister Negative, the Punisher's assault on the Hood, the dismantling of Camp Hammond, and various other issues. Loki seeks to use her own Avengers to weaken and break Osborn, a goal shared by Doom and Namor, and gathers all of them once more in her previous guise as the Scarlet Witch. At the issue's end, it is decided never to again meet thus, due to the psychic plane's revealing nature, as shown when Osborn's face shifted to that of his Green Goblin persona's, Loki smiling when the Cabal wonders who ever suggested such a meeting place in the first place.

Nevertheless, the Cabal meets again on the psychic plane with the aid of Emma Frost, prior to the events of Utopia, but after the Asgardians have been moved to Latveria. Doom tells the Cabal that he has already told Osborn how to storm the Baxter Building, to which Loki remarks that the events in America are always of interest, although admittedly less so now that the Asgardians have been successfully moved to Latveria. Namor comments that though their alliance might be mutually beneficial for them, he fails to see how it might benefit the rest of the Cabal, to which Loki responds that a rising tide "raises all ships", which Namor objects, expressing his preference for a maelstrom that sinks all ships. Namor further expresses distaste for the Hood's presence, claiming that monarchs did not consort with criminals as equals, to which Osborn himself defends the Hood. Loki (still in her female form) also reveals to Osborn that she was responsible for granting the new Enchantress of the Young Masters her mystical powers, apparently because of the mischief such would cause.

Far more sinister tensions were also brewing among the Cabal members. Norman Osborn had more potential enemies that even he could imagine. Namor and Doctor Doom were secretly working behind Osborn's back, aware that their plots against Osborn could erupt into the greatest battle their dimension has ever seen should all not go to plan, having formed a mutual alliance some time after the Civil War, involving Namor and his people moving to Latveria, with Steve Rogers fallen, the Illuminati fraught with chaos and mistrust, with both Stark and Xavier having failed to provide sufficient support for him, and the entirety of S.H.I.E.L.D. hunting him. Morgan le Fay desperately attempted to convey the fact that Doom would betray Osborn onto the latter, to Osborn's apparent lack of concern due to his Iron Patriot suit. Namor and Osborn's own disagreements also arose from the Cabal meeting of the Atlantean terrorists, and the former had departed the Dark X-Men, aiding Frost in her apparent betrayal of the Dark X-Men, due to their romantic relationship. Namor's other love with his cousin, the Agent of Atlas Namora, who is attempting to sabotage Osborn and his forces, has also weakened his Cabal relationship with him, though the latter bond was from the secret plotting of the Atlantean elders to start a relationship and mate a long time ago as human/Atlantean hybrids are so powerful. Namor and Namora decide to part ways as they were unsure how much of their feelings for each other were genuine and how much was due to the secret plotting by the elders. The Agents of Atlas, when visiting his kingdom, suggested that Namor cut his connection with Osborn, to which he responded that if he ignored Osborn, his people would be affected still.

Loki had been preparing to place "cracks" in Osborn's mental armor to hasten his eventual fall from power, using the Mighty Avengers for such a purpose, and scheming to set the Mighty Avengers against his Dark Avengers eventually. However, Loki is also cruel and conniving, willing to remove those she deemed possibly disruptive to her own plans, such as Cassandra Lang and Pietro Maximoff. When Wiccan cast a spell to bring Scarlet Witch to them, Loki appears as Scarlet Witch and states that Cassandra Lang sealed their fates, to be shortly ambushed by Ronin. Soon enough, he determines that she's not Wanda, just by kissing her and stating that the real Scarlet Witch would've used her power to revive Cassandra's father. Afraid of exposure due to Wiccan's magic threatening to reveal her true form, Loki was forced to leave swearing all their deaths. At the first Cabal meeting, Loki says that she wants Asgard, back in the heavens where it belongs, when asked by Namor of her own desires. The Son of Satan, Doctor Strange and Doctor Voodoo joined forces to magically purge Dormammu from his vessel, the Hood. Loki visited the severely burned Robbins, revealing to him her desire to use him as an additional instrument to Osborn's collapse, and gave him a "second chance", thus indebting him to her; it is later revealed that Loki, Madame Masque and the Hood had journeyed together to Cuba and located the Asgardian Norn Stones to serve as a new power source for the Hood. In Siege: The Cabal, though Osborn appears to place trust in Loki and is working with him personally to counter the Asgard issue, his Green Goblin persona (later revealed to actually be created by Loki's magic) warns him that Loki is the God of Mischief and thus cannot be trusted as an ally, for he seeks to better only his own agenda. However, the Hood's own deals with Osborn, his new debt to Loki, and Namor's uncertainty that he should be of the Cabal at all, complicated matters even more; despite the Hood and Osborn's friction and different viewpoints, the latter did defend Parker when Namor questions the Hood's position in their secret group. Emma Frost and Parker Robbins have not met each other before the Cabal's first gathering, and their first encounter ended poorly, with Robbins threatening Frost, to which she responds with making the Hood redirect his gun into his mouth and detecting the presence of Dormammu, though their relationship seems to be milder the second time they have interacted.

Some time after the formation of the Cabal, Namor privately meets with T'Challa, the Black Panther of Wakanda, attempting to recruit Wakanda's monarch into the secret Cabal, confiding in him that Norman Osborn had made deals with him and four others, as well as revealing the identities of the Cabal. T'Challa objects, saying that, as he even rejected a seat among the Illuminati, an alliance of honourable men, he finds no reason to affiliate himself with the villainous Cabal. T'Challa also expresses the belief that he believes that Osborn is too unstable to maintain his power for long, to which Namor agrees, claiming that when Osborn did collapse, there would be an opportunity for leveler heads to seize power. Namor left after telling him he had come out of respect for his friendship and that T'Challa's old allies were weak, shaking hands with him. Though Namor ends the meeting and leaves the Panther without conflict, T'Challa is shortly assaulted by Doctor Doom and his Doombots, resulting in his near-demise, to be replaced with his sister Shuri.  The Wakandans, especially Shuri, poorly regard Doctor Doom, but Namor as well, with Shuri clashing with him directly in retaliation for his part in her brother's fall from majesty and power, not knowing that Doctor Doom is secretly fooling them into thinking that Namor was responsible for the brutal attack on T'Challa, not him. However, the Fantastic Four manage to intervene in time to stop Shuri and Namor's battle, revealing the deception both had been under, and Namor joins his new and old allies against his former fellow Cabal member as he begins to execute his master plan for the complete takeover of Wakanda.
  
Loki, shortly before Thor released all the trapped Asgardians from their mortal vessels, contacted Victor von Doom mystically through her spirit and struck a bargain, later revealed to be that of offering the Asgardians a home in Latveria after having banished Thor. Loki is shown visiting Doom in secret meetings and dinners and proposing a more personal relationship between the two of them, separate from the Cabal, which Doom considers more of an association, showing amusement in the poisonous toxins placed in her food, and Doom's attempts to incinerate her, at the meal, claiming to Doom it meant he was taking her seriously. It is revealed that the Doom Loki had first met with at the dinner was but a robotic duplicate, and Doom was testing her to see if she was the genuine Goddess of Mischief. Loki assures him that Odin is gone and Balder is weak and easily manipulated to her purposes, as well as addressing Doom's concerns for Thor by promising to personally deal with her adopted brother. The meeting ends with Doctor Doom agreeing to Loki's terms of moving the Asgardians to Latveria, for unclear reasons (later revealed to apparently be the chance of stealing the power of immortality from the gods), with Loki promising to grant him the one thing he lacks, seeking to become absolute ruler over the divided Asgardians.

Loki moves all the Asgardians through a portal she herself has conjured directly to Latveria, which the Asgardians all find to their liking. As the events of Utopia begin to unfold, Loki, having been restored back to his male form after abandoning Sif's body, and Doctor Doom together watch the mutant situation heat up, pleased that things are now getting "interesting". His daughter Hela later indirectly but knowingly agrees to help the X-Men dispel Osborn's forces from Utopia. It is revealed that in exchange for giving the Asgardians a new home, Doom has provided her with a small army of Doombots to help him kill his target, who is later revealed to be Donald Blake. Loki then goes to prepare his own gift for Doom, talking to an Asgardian named Endrik, casting a spell on him that makes him fall into a sleep. Loki used Endrik as a sacrifice for Doom so that he could try to use his organs to make himself immortal just like the Asgardians. Loki then spots Bill as he was watching them talk about their plans, sending three rogue Asgardians after him. Bill tries to fight them off, but he is stabbed in the gut by one of the superior Asgardian warriors. Doom also prepared three modified Doombots to finish off Donald Blake for Loki, but this assassination attempt is thwarted, however narrowly. Loki questions Doom's not placing his trust in him even after all these months, but Doom warns him that Doom is not the puppet of men, gods, or tricksters and that even if he was so inclined to place such trust in others, he understands that there are empty vessels in which trust should never be placed in, claiming that Loki was "false". It is revealed that Doom also desires to use the Asgardians as "an army of gods I can use as a first line of defense against my enemies."

However, Doom later claims to the goddess Kelda when she demands Loki come forth to suffer her wrath, that "The trickster is here no longer. Doom and he have parted ways." Loki later returns to Balder just before he leads his Asgardians to launch an assault against Doom in vengeance for his crimes against them, apparently trying to warn them of what Doom is up to: experimenting on their people. Balder doesn't believe him at all and declares that he share die for his deceit, to which Loki admits that it is his fault for bringing them to Latveria and asks for a fair trial before death. Later, after Thor intervenes in the battle against Doom, Loki tells him and the other Asgardians that from Doom had boasted, he believes that life could still be restored to Kelda if they succeeded in returning her heart to her body, later using his magic to help sustain Kelda as Thor struggles against the Destroyer-armored Doom and Balder attempts to find Kelda's heart. In the end of the battle, Thor manages to best Doctor Doom and the Destroyer by holding his own against it until its finite energy supply was depleted. However, it is revealed that Loki and Doom had also been orchestrating the battle as well, with Loki teleporting Doom from peril at the battle's end and Doom having procured some of Loki's own genetic code to create a clone of the Trickster deity, which he dissects and eagerly experiments upon; Loki, after he and the Asgardians have returned to Oklahoma, back in Balder's favor for his role in saving Kelda, assures Doom that, despite full victory not having been theirs, both of them will profit from this day "in time". Later, when Osborn assaults Doom during the Siege Cabal meeting, Loki shows only amusement when his (apparently former) ally is being slain, yet neither does not seem troubled when Doom's nanites tear down Avengers Tower and brutally assail Norman Osborn himself. Additionally, it is also revealed after Loki's death months later, that Loki had lured the Asgardians into Latveria for an opportunity to attain a shard of Kelda's pure soul, to use in his Eir-Gram weapon against the cannibalistic hordes of Dísir that threatened Asgard's dead.

Some time after the drastic events of the 2009 "Utopia" storyline, but before the Siege of Asgard, after Loki releases the Absorbing Man to play out his own complex schemes against both the Mighty and Dark Avengers, Osborn attempts to call together the Cabal, but Namor and Frost have defected, Doom refuses to answer his call, and the Hood cuts him off and demands that they do this "later" when he finally contacts him; however, Loki appears to him, and, while Osborn demands that they use the full force of their alliance to crush Pym until not a single Pym Particle remained, Loki instead persuades Osborn that doing so against one called "the Wasp" was beneath him, and openly outshining Pym would be more to his favor; the two teams of Avengers soon gather as one to confront the Absorbing Man, the conflict ending with Loki giving Osborn an enchanted sword to defeat the villain and Loki using subtle magics to help restore Osborn's media popularity.

Shortly before events of the Siege of Asgard, Loki was captured by the new Scientist Supreme Hank Pym and his Mighty Avengers using a new technological invention that disrupts even his powers and is capable of torturing him; Quicksilver especially is angry at Loki, demanding Loki divulge the current whereabouts of his sister, to which Loki claims he does not know, having merely taken her form. Loki manages to mystically contact his brother Thor, who arrives and, repulsed at Pym's machine and methods, has Loki freed, though allows Pym to pose one query to his brother as a boon. Pym asks Loki whether he would like to join his Mighty Avengers, as he had inadvertently helped form both teams, to the disgust of everyone present, resulting in his Avengers disbanding, and even Loki and Thor agreeing that Pym is "a lunatic".

Even Emma Frost's relationship with Osborn was uneasy, being initially reluctant to become part of the Cabal due to her differences, and even when she accepted her place among them, she and Osborn were not seeing "eye-to-eye." Before Namor and Doom spoke together about their intended plans for Osborn, Namor and Frost telepathically communicated with each other, and agree to later meet privately to discuss a possible new alliance; Doom is thus made aware of their own past and possible close relationship. In addition, due to their romantic past, Frost has made a secret deal with Namor, vowing to protect the latter psychically from Osborn and the other members of the Cabal, in exchange for Namor swearing to protect mutantkind as if they were his own flesh and blood, which Frost points out that they are. At the same time, with the X-Men, tensions have risen between her and Scott Summers, as is evident when the X-Men, led by Cyclops, is on a mission searching for Daken and the Muramasa Blade; Scott claims that Emma might have been able to give them a specific location, but she simply does not, with Hisako asking whether the two of them agreed to the merits of the mission, but Cyclops countered that though he and Emma shared many things, leadership of the X-Men was not one of them, also saying that they could not count upon her. Meanwhile, Frost contacts Osborn through a secure channel, reminding him that they "had a deal" and asking him to call Daken off, to which Osborn, protected by state-of-the-art psychic shields and flanked by Ares and Venom, asks her why would he comply, as well as claiming that though he knew nothing about Daken's activities, now that his curiosity was piqued, he insisted Emma enlighten him.

As the X-Men and Dark X-Men prepared to face off, Emma revealed her role as a double agent, hardened through her discovery of Xavier's torture and Osborn's lack of concern for her people, defeating the Dark X-Men with Namor's assistance. It is primarily because of their growing mistrust of Osborn, with Namor's discoveries of the Sentry slaying the Atlantean terrorists but initially containing his rage  but later joining the Dark X-Men because of his romance with Emma Frost, who convinced him to join the Dark X-Men and psychically enters his mind, seeking to uncover the answers to some of her questions. Frost extended an invitation to Cloak and Dagger to join the true X-Men as they teleported to the newly created island base, Utopia. Both Frost and Namor's relationship with Osborn appear to be deeply strained at this point, with the former Green Goblin telling the Dark Avengers and Dark X-Men to bring him Namor's head and Emma Frost's heart and that Summers sees them do it. Emma Frost and Namor both officially quit the Cabal, to be replaced with two new members, "without the other remaining Cabal members having any say in the matter" in Siege: The Cabal. However, an enraged and vengeful Osborn now unhesitantly strives to destroy Namor and his people as payback for his betrayal and joining the X-Men. Emma Frost promises to help him as he has helped her and her team, and the entire team of X-Men immediately work to investigate the Atlantean casualties, evacuate the survivors, and aid Namor against this mysterious new marine threat, the Marrina-Monster. Namor is forced to kill his former lover to stop her, but soon confronts Osborn over his controlling her to get revenge on Namor, vowing to kill him for his crimes. Though the actual confrontation is unseen, later Namor's name is seen crossed out on Osborn's List. Elsewhere, Namor and Reed Richards reach the tomb of Captain America, but discovers no dead body of their fallen comrade, to the shock of both men. Despite Doom's displeasure at Osborn's moving against Namor in Siege: The Cabal and his demanding Osborn stop his course of revenge (which led to the destruction of their own alliance), it is revealed that as "every hero involved in the coming conflict desires vengeance on Doom for various reasons", Emma Frost and Namor, now both members in good standing of the X-Men, will also seek to make Doom pay for his treachery against them, in DoomWar, which indicates that for a variety of reasons, from Doom's capturing of the X-Man Storm to his deceptive attempt to convince Shuri that it was actually Namor who had assaulted her brother, has destroyed Doom's once-strong alliance with Namor. Furthermore, Doom has also claimed that he does not trust Namor, due to the two of them having clashed after they allied against common foes in the past, and should his alliance with Namor fail, with Namor turning on him, he would be willing to join forces with Attuma, an arch-enemy of Namor's, and one he believes could serve as a "counter" to Namor. At some point into the Dark Reign after the formation of the Cabal, though it is depicted that a large portion of Atlantean civilians still reside in the oceans under Namor's rule, Namor makes it clear that the Atlantean military is still residing in Latveria, when he proposes for an Atlantean mutant to move to Latveria with them, though no such military force was seen when Doom was assaulted by Morgan le Fay  or when the Asgardians moved into Latveria. However, Namor, after the events of Utopia, reveals to the X-Men upon Osborn's schemes causing hundreds if not thousands of his people to perish, that the Atlantean military force were far away, "outside" of Latveria, implying that though his alliance with Osborn has been destroyed, his alliance with Doctor Doom in some form still exists.

Norman Osborn, chooses Taskmaster as the fifth member of his new Cabal due to his part in driving off recent threats to Camp H.A.M.M.E.R., despite doubts from the Hood, and tells Robbins that he sees Taskmaster as a valuable asset to their covert group. Osborn also adds that whilst he and the Hood are "businessmen", Osborn recognizes Dr. Doom as a "megalomaniac" and Loki as one who regards them "little more than talking fruit flies", warning the Hood that one or both of them might soon turn against them due to Frost and Namor's betrayal destabilizing the Cabal. However, Osborn adds that he is prepared for such betrayals, and after dealing with them, he will form a new Cabal, an organization he can control completely. Taskmaster and the Hood later both join Osborn in his Siege of Asgard, battling against the Avengers.

Though the relationships of all of the other five Cabal members are filled with unease and tension, Norman Osborn himself is neither blind nor defenseless with his H.A.M.M.E.R. resources, Dark Avengers, Iron Patriot armor, and the mysterious shadowy figure (or "secret weapon") Osborn has used to threaten the Cabal if they sought to betray him combined together making him a formidable ally and enemy, revealed to be the dark side of the Sentry, the immensely powerful and deadly Void.

In the major events of Siege: The Cabal, Norman Osborn, having succumbed to his Green Goblin persona and the fear that Asgard would pose a threat to the natural order and Earth itself, gathers the Cabal once again, with Doctor Doom arriving and arrogantly showing distaste for Taskmaster's presence among the Cabal. Doom demands that Osborn at once reverse his course of action against his ally Namor, to which Osborn refuses, saying that he and Emma Frost had "crossed the line" with him. Doom, loathing Thor and the Asgardians all the more due to his recent defeat at their hands, claims that he will support Osborn's "madness" should Namor be returned to him, but Osborn refuses. Osborn's mysterious ally, the Void, violently attacks Doctor Doom, and an apparently amused Loki tells the Hood that he should go, as there is nothing here for either of them, which the Hood, now loyal to Loki due to his hand in the restoration of his mystical abilities, agrees. However, it is revealed that "Doom" is actually an upgraded Doombot, which releases swarms of Doombot nanites against the Cabal, tearing down Avengers Tower and forcing its denizens, such as the Dark Avengers, to evacuate. Osborn is rescued by the Sentry, who destroys the body. When Osborn contacts Doom, Doom tells him not to ever strike him again or he is willing to go further. Osborn later attempts to get the authority to lead an assault against Asgard from the President of the United States, but fails. Loki tells him that to begin his Siege successfully, he will require an "inciting incident", similar to the one which started the Civil War.

Loki and Osborn observe Volstagg, seeking to start his adventures like Thor, make his way to Chicago. Volstagg forcefully stops the car of a wild gunsman trying to escape, but is at once engaged by four powerful members of the Hood's crime syndicate, the U-Foes, with Loki having arranged with Parker Robbins to send them to attack Volstagg, who is blasted into the middle of a football field. The ensuing conflict is so colossal that the entire football field is obliterated, and Loki and Osborn have successfully created the inciting incident they had sought, beginning the Siege of Asgard. Loki later warns Balder at Asgard that Midgard is mobilizing against Asgard, claiming (falsely) that he tried to reason with and stop Norman Osborn.

Loki, when Osborn called out to him for their aid, later apparently sends the Hood and his syndicate as reinforcements to help Osborn's forces against the Avengers, and when Thor asks Osborn where was Loki in all this, the unstable Osborn claimed that he was "dead", just like all of them, due to the Void fully released now.

Loki, horrified by the terrible damage the Void and his own manipulations have caused, calls back the Norn Stones from the Hood (possibly aided by Odin), removing him of all power, and uses it to revive and empower the mortal and immortal heroes struck down by the Void. However, the Void soon discovers that it is he who is responsible for saving the heroes, and brutally slaughters him in moments, despite Thor and Iron Man's combined efforts to reach him, causing the heroes to lose all their power. However, Loki's actions and sacrifice had managed to weaken the Void, and enrage Thor enough to savagely assail it, with such force and brutality, that, aided by Iron Man and the other Avengers, along with the Sentry's own desperate plea for himself to be slain, he was able to repel and eventually annihilate the Void, and with it, the Sentry.

The Dark Reign is thus forever ended after the failed Siege of Asgard, with Norman Osborn, the Hood, and Taskmaster all eventually apprehended and placed in custody (with Osborn's Green Goblin person mocking him as he says that had it not been interfering, he would not have failed so miserably), Frost and Namor remaining with the X-Men and battling alongside the mutants through the events of Second Coming and beyond, Loki physically destroyed but his spirit not bound to Hela, and Doctor Doom remaining ruler of Latveria and attempting to further his ambitions by seizing Wakanda's vibranium to amplify his mystic powers to levels untold and to build an unstoppable army, thus allowing him to conquer the world.

Emma Frost, Namor, and Doom are not involved in the events of the actual Siege, though some of the X-Men are depicted as observing as Osborn is unmasked on live television. Maria Hill later attempts (apparently unsuccessfully) to persuade the President and his Cabinet to contact the Fantastic Four and the X-Men to aid the Avengers against the Hood's forces. All three are heavily involved in the events of DoomWar, taking place shortly after the events of Siege and the downfall of Norman Osborn and his already-crippled Cabal, with the Fantastic Four and the X-Men joining forces with their ally T'Challa against Doctor Doom.

The New Cabal
During the reborn Illuminati's quest to save Earth from the incursions (multi-dimensional planet crashes), the moral cost begins to overwhelm the members, except Namor. When the Illuminati decides to give up, Namor brings together a new Cabal consisting of himself, Thanos, Maximus the Mad, Black Order members Corvus Glaive and Proxima Midnight, Terrax the Truly Enlightened and Black Swan to destroy the other worlds. Eight months later, having taken over the ruins of Wakanda as a base, the new Cabal has been given permission by Earth's governments to take down the incursions, though Namor admits his Cabal members are far more vicious and uncontrollable than he previously thought. Growing disgusted with their wholesale slaughter, Namor collaborates with the Illuminati in a plan to destroy the Cabal by trapping them on the next Earth to be destroyed, but Black Panther and Black Bolt deliberately leave Namor behind to die with the Cabal for his past actions. Unbeknownst to the Avengers, however, that world ended up having two simultaneous Incursions, allowing Namor and the Cabal to escape to the third Earth, the Ultimate Marvel Earth, and upon arrival, meeting that universe's Reed Richards. When the final incursion occurs, the Cabal manage to escape the destruction in a specially-designed 'life-pod', unaware that they have been 'followed' by the new Spider-Man of the Ultimate Earth, who sneaked into the pod while invisible.

Alternate versions

Possible future
In a startling vision of a possible future, envisioned by Doctor Doom (possibly with the aid of his mystical abilities) to occur should Osborn not fall to his nature and implode, one year later after the first meeting of the Cabal, Norman Osborn's powers have only grown, and the Dark Reign is supreme; the Dark Avengers (Sentry, Daken, Venom, Bullseye, and Moonstone) are gathered with Namor, Osborn and Doom. Doom, bearing the Hood's cloak, has fought and slain Robbins, and has imprisoned Emma Frost and Loki as half-naked slaves chained to his throne. The Cosmic Cube is in his possession, and, after teleporting the Dark Avengers to the other side of the universe, he and Namor defeat and kill Osborn. At the end, Dr. Doom fantasizes about the day where he will dispose of Namor as well, and take his place as ruler of the entire world, over both the lands and the seas.

In other media

Television
Two incarnations of the Cabal appear in Avengers Assemble.
 Throughout the season one episodes "The Avengers Protocol" Pt. 2, "The Serpent of Doom", and "Blood Feud", the Red Skull and MODOK resolve to counter the Avengers by forming the Cabal and invite Attuma, Doctor Doom, and Dracula to join them, though all but Doom agree to do so. The Cabal later recruit Justin Hammer's Super-Adaptoid and Hyperion in "Super-Adaptoid" and "Bring On the Bad Guys" respectively. Following the Cabal's failed attempt to attack Doom for not joining them and successfully obtaining the Tesseract in "The Ambassador" and "By the Numbers" respectively, in "Exodus", the Red Skull builds a machine powered by the Tesseract and attempts to send the Cabal through four portals to other worlds. However, Iron Man discovers the portals would have killed them before defeating the Red Skull, who uses the Tesseract to become the Cosmic Skull. In "The Final Showdown", the remaining Cabal members attempt to infiltrate Avengers Tower to defeat their former leader, but are captured by the Avengers. While the Avengers fight the Cosmic Skull, Iron Man convinces the Cabal to help them before MODOK separates the Tesseract from the Cosmic Skull, turning him back into the Red Skull. After the Red Skull and the Tesseract disappear in a portal, MODOK assumes leadership of the Cabal and teleports them away.
 A second incarnation of the Cabal appears in the two-part season four episode "Avengers No More", seemingly led by the Leader and consisting of Arnim Zola, Kang the Conqueror, the Enchantress, and the Executioner. Using a prototype Arc Reactor and stolen Vibranium, the Cabal builds a static expander to trap the Avengers. This leads to the Black Panther forming the All-New, All-Different Avengers to help rescue them and fight the Cabal. When the Leader is defeated, the others choose not to help him and instead activate the static expander's override to scatter the captive Avengers across time and space. In "The Return", the New Avengers successfully rescue the original Avengers before discovering Loki is the Cabal's true leader and join forces to defeat him.

Video games
 The Cabal makes a cameo appearance at the end of Marvel Avengers: Battle for Earth.
 The Cabal appears in Marvel Contest of Champions, led by the Red Skull and consisting of Iron Patriot, Loki, the Kingpin, and Punisher 2099.

Miscellaneous
The Cabal appears in the comic book prequel for Marvel vs. Capcom 3: Fate of Two Worlds, consisting of Doctor Doom, Magneto, MODOK, Super-Skrull, and Taskmaster as well as Capcom characters Albert Wesker and Akuma. Wesker proposes that the Cabal aid him in conquering his Earth, as it lacks superheroes, but they are unable to find a power source for opening a portal. Super-Skrull suggests they steal equipment from Galactus, which the rest of the Cabal agrees to. This brings the heroes of both the Marvel and Capcom universes together to stop them.

See also
 Dark Reign
 Dark Avengers
 Dark X-Men

References

External links
Profiles on Loki and the Hood in Dark Reign 
Profile on Doctor Doom in Dark Reign 

Characters created by Brian Michael Bendis
Comics characters introduced in 2009
Fictional organizations in Marvel Comics
Marvel Comics supervillain teams